Smithton Township (Township 1 South, Range 8 West) is located in St. Clair County, Illinois. As of the 2010 census, its population was 4,275 and it contained 1,684 housing units.

Geography

Demographics

Elected Officials
The current Members of the Smithton Township Board are Supervisor William F. Weber; Trustees Donald Barkau, Mark Rodriguez, Neil Espenschied, Quentin Grommet; Highway Commissioner Paul Reinneck; Clerk Troy L. Herring.

All seven Smithton Township Officials are serving a four-year term that ends in May, 2021.

References

External links
City-data.com
St. Clair County Official Site
Illinois State Archives

Townships in St. Clair County, Illinois
Townships in Illinois